Dioman is a town in the far west of Ivory Coast. It is a sub-prefecture of Touba Department in Bafing Region, Woroba District.

Dioman was a commune until March 2012, when it became one of 1126 communes nationwide that were abolished.

In 2014, the population of the sub-prefecture of Dioman was 4,817.

Villages
The twenty three villages of the sub-prefecture of Dioman and their population in 2014 are:

Notes

Sub-prefectures of Bafing Region
Former communes of Ivory Coast